"Drama Queen" is a song by German pop singer Vanessa Petruo. Written by Petruo, Alexander Geringas, and Thorsten Brötzmann, it was released by Polydor and Cheyenne Records on 26 April 2004 as Petrus's first solo single following the disbandment of her group No Angels in fall 2003. The pop song achieved moderate success on the charts, peaking at number eleven in Germany, number 35 in Austria and number 88 in Switzerland. "Drama Queen" marked Petruo's only release with the label and her former No Angels management.

Track listings

Personnel
Credits adapted from the liner notes of "Drama Queen".

 Vanessa Petruo – vocals, lyrics
 Thorsten Brötzmann – lyrics, production, keyboards
 Alexander Geringas – lyrics, keyboards
 Jeo – mixing
 Christoph Leis-Bendorff – choir arrangement
 Anya Mahnken – choir arrangement
 Nightshift – production (remix)
 Peter Weihe – guitar

Charts

References

External links 
 "Drama Queen" at the YouTube
 "Drama Queen" at the Discogs.com

2004 songs
2004 debut singles
Vanessa Petruo songs
Songs written by Thorsten Brötzmann
Songs written by Alexander Geringas